Ali Mourade (born October 17, 1984) is a Comorian footballer who plays as a defender.

Club career
In 2011, he signed with Swiss side FC La Sarraz-Ecläpens.

International career
In 2011, he made his debut for the Comoros national football team.

References

1984 births
Living people
Comorian footballers
Comoros international footballers
French footballers
French sportspeople of Comorian descent
Footballers from Marseille
Association football defenders